Tecolotlán ( "place of owls") is a town and municipality, in Jalisco in central-western Mexico. The municipality covers an area of  795.55 km².

As of 2005, the municipality had a total population of 14,984.

Famous places

La presa El Pochote, El Carril, El Malecón, El Punto, La Perla, and Sierra de Quila.

History
The name of Tecolotlán derives from the words "tecolote" (owl) and "tlan" (town), meaning "town of owls". The current coat of arms, formally approved of by the municipal council on 27 April 1999 ordinary, designed by Ernesto Garcia de Alba Cruz, has a figure of an owl on it with outstretched wings representing the municipality. At the base of the shield is the name of the municipality and its founding date of 1524 when conquistador Francisco Cortes conquered the area of San Buenaventura. The area was placedu under the command of his trustees Pedro Gómez and Martín Monje.

The evangelization of the natives took place between 1525 and 1526. In 1825, Tecolotlán was composed of the people of Xuchitl and Ayotitlan and farms and ranches of San Juan Buenavista, Quila, Tenextitlán, Agua Caliente, Santa Maria, San Jose and Santa Rita. In 1599, the convent of San Agustin de Tecolotlán was founded.

A decree of July 9, 1835 formally established the municipality of Tecolotlán. However at this time the place was barely more than a small village and 2,600 huts were recorded in 1843. On June 23, 1844, the town hall was renovated in Tecolotlán in compliance with the decree No. 5 of the State Congress passed on April 8 of the same year. On November 10, 1866, a battalion of 3 men faced a contingent of 1,500 men under Berthelin who died in battle.

The town

The town offers its residents the services of drinking water, sewerage, street lighting, markets, flea market, parking lots, cemeteries, roads, public toilets, social security, transit, parks and gardens, and sports centers. As of 2005, 89.6% of people have drinking water, 77.8% have proper sanitation and 97.5% have electricity. The town has a post office, telegraph, telephone, fax, radio and television.

The La Purísima Sanctuary is dedicated to the Virgin of Tecolotlán. It was built between 1821 and 1869.

The current Temple of La Santisima Trinidad dates from the 19th century and has a Three-foiled cusped arch with star and plant decorated pediment above. It was originally built as the Parish of San Agustin by the Franciscans in 1599, but when the church was rebuilt, it was dedicated to the Holy Trinity.

The Tecolotlan Cultural Center building was constructed in the mid 19th century by Serapio Perez. Architectural elements include arches with Corinthian style capitols that top the columns. The center hosts art exhibitions as well as exhibitions of fossils and other antiquities.

Carnaval is celebrated here with musical bands on the main square of town. Men serenade women, confetti is thrown and dances are held. The festival lasts ten days and also includes cockfights, fireworks and the crowning of a Carnaval Queen.

The patron saint festivities are celebrated from August 20–30, to worship the patron saints of Tecolotlán: St. Augustine and Santa Rosa de Lima. Festivities also include carnival rides such as a ferris wheel, etc

The municipality 
Tecolotlán is located in the midwest of the state at an altitude of 1285 meters above sea level. The municipality, which covers an area of 795.55 square kilometres is bordered on the north by the municipalities of Atengo, Ameca and San Martín de Hidalgo, to the east by the municipalities of San Martín de Hidalgo, Cocula, Atemajac de Brizuela and Chiquilistlan, to the south by the municipalities of Chiquilistlan, Juchitlán and Tenamaxtlán and to the west by the municipalities of Tenamaxtlán and Atengo. The municipality contains 47 localities, the most important being Tecolotlán (the capital), Tamazulita, Quila, Ayotitlán and Cofradía de Duendes.

Topography 
The municipal area is made up of relatively flat areas but has some hilly areas to the north and southeast, ranging from 1,200 to 2,400 meters. The hills include El Huehuentón (at 2000 metres),  El Pichacho (at 1,700 metres), and others such as Cerro del Colotepec, Salto Colorado, El Tecolote, El Carrizal, La Coronilla, La Ventana. Cuchillos, Prieto, and Picachitos.

Hydrography 
The main river is the Ferrería River, which has a number of tributary streams such as El Jabalí, Gallinero, Tamazula, Tecolotlán, Las Canoas, Colorado, Cofradía, Sauz and the Amarillo. The San Pedro Dam is located to the south of the municipality. Other water features include Presa El Pochote, Cascada Tecolotán, Salto de Santa Rosa, Salto de La Campana, Salto del Venado, Salto Seco and Salto de La Disciplina.

Flora 
The municipality is covered with 30,900 hectares of pine and oak forests with some fruit trees. In the Sierra de Quila near the towns of Tenamaxtlan, Ameca, Atengo and San Martin Hidalgo, there is a tree named the Arbol de la Lira (Lyre Tree) which is approximately 600 years old. It is protected by the state environmental agency. The forest that surrounds the tree covers about 15,000 hectares and is guarded 24 hours a day. This forest is also home to the Cienega spring, which is surrounded by exuberant vegetation and has a monitoring station nearby.

Fauna 
Animals that inhabit this region are deer, badger, raccoon, wolf, fox, coyote, rabbit and some small reptiles and a variety of birds.

Ecology 
Protected areas include La Ciénega, Las Juntas, Las Piedras de Quila and Sierra de Quila. There is also a notable palaeontological site at Gliptodonte; many unearthed artifacts are located within the "Museo Comunitario" in the main town.

Climate 
The climate is moderately warm and semi-dry, and dry in the autumn and winter with an average annual temperature is 23 °C., with a maximum of 31 °C. and minimum of 15 °C. The rainfall falls heaviest in June and July, and a total of 773.1 mm is received annually on average. Prevailing winds approach from the south.

Terrestrial communications 
The main road in the municipality for transportation is via the Guadalajara-Barra de Navidad, 107 kilometres from the state capital. Urban and rural transportation takes place in rental and private vehicles.

Attractions 
Most of the municipality's attractions are natural with a variety of scenic landscapes, especially the Sierra de Quila.  While not well developed, the area is suitable for ecotourism activities such as mountain biking, horseback riding, camping and other activities. There are two principle dams, the Presa del Ahogado and the Presa del Pochote. Both have facilities for camping and picnicking as well as water sports such as boating and fishing. The Presa del Pochote is popular with residents of the city of Guadalajara.

Religion 
The main religion is Roman Catholicism, and notable churches within the municipality include the Parroquia del Sagrado Corazón, Santuario de la Purísima, Capilla de San José, Ermita de San Genaro, Capilla de la Cruz Verde, Capilla del Señor del Socorro, Capilla de San José María Robles, Parroquia de la Virgencita.

Economy 
The economy is largely agriculturally based with some trade and services. Livestock reared include bovine, goat, equine, pig and bees and crops grown include corn, chickpeas, alfalfa, peach, avocado, mango and pitayas. There is also some manufacturing and mining activity, with lime and cement factories and mining of marble, limestone, barite, quartz and lime. There is also some fishing of carp and bass and logging of pine and oak. As of 2005 there was some 30,900 hectares of forest. The municipality produces basketry and pottery and clay pots, and wooden furniture. It produces mainly dairy products such as cheese and cream.

Government

Municipal presidents

Notable people

 Juan Salvador Agraz – Chemical engineer, founder of the National School of Chemical Science (now, Faculty of Chemistry in the National Autonomous University of Mexico (UNAM).
 Abraham Ángel Agraz García de Alba – Author, professor at the Chapingo Autonomous University, in Texcoco, State of Mexico.
 Gabriel Agraz García de Alba – Historian.
 Liza Carvajal – International model and TV actress.
 Bernardo Cueva Estrella – Distributor.
 Abraham García de Alba – Author and director de la Universidad de Guadalajara (UdeG).
 Ruperto García de Alba – General and acting governor of Jalisco, 1930-1931.
 Esteban García de Alba Larios – Attorney at Law, politician, president of the Mexican Senate during the government of Manuel Ávila Camacho. Founder of Pensiones del Estado de Jalisco. He built several multi-family homes, some of them in Tlatelolco. Ambassador representing Mexico before the League of Nations.
 Ana Bertha Lepe – actress and Miss Mexico in 1954.
 Sara Pimienta – Poetess.
 J. Félix Ruelas Morelos – Cantor and organist.
 Héctor Gabriel Vera Santos – Singer and soccer player.

References

(Category:Notable person Hector Gabriel Vera Santos "Singer and Soccer player"

Municipalities of Jalisco